John Bacon was a vintner, the landlord at the one time important hostelry named the Brownhill Inn, that lay in open country to the south of Closeburn in Nithsdale on the Ayr to Dumfries Road. From 1788 to 1791 the poet Robert Burns spent many an evening at Bacon's inn whilst travelling on his Excise duties. A coaching stop and hostelry, the inn lay about 7 miles north of Ellisland Farm, Burns's home before the family moved into Dumfries. During their tour of August–September 1803 Dorothy Wordsworth, with her brother William Wordsworth and mutual friend Samuel Taylor Coleridge were hosted by Bacon and his wife at their inn.

Life, family and character

Bacon's wife and the landlady at the Brownhill Inn, was Catherine Stewart whose parents had run an inn at Closeburn Kirk Bridge. John and Catherine were married at Closeburn Kirk on 2 October 1782.

Thomas Stewart and Jean Lees of Closeburn Kirk Brig were parents to a Catherine Stewart born on 16 February 1790. Catherine pre-deceased her husband who died in 1824 and John and Joseph Bacon recorded as his executors and closest relatives, could have been their sons.

In 1803 an idea of how they kept the inn was given by Dorothy Wordsworth who wrote that "It was as pretty a room as a thoroughly dirty one could be, a square parlour painted green, but so covered over with smoke and dirt that it looked not unlike green seen through black gauze." 

The list of his chattels upon his death in 1824 includes farm stock and crops, suggesting that he was involved in farming in some way.

Polly Stewart, William Stewart's daughter would often stay with her aunt and uncle at the inn and she would have met Robert Burns there.

In 1797 Bacon had six horses that were kept in the stables on the west side of the road. He also had one four wheeled carriage.

Burns, when asked on one occasion by a commercial traveller, surnamed Ladyman, to prove that it was really the famous poet that he was dining on bacon and beans with, Burns made up on the spot the following epigram that highlighted the personality quirk of Bacon to often overstay his welcome when serving customers:

Burns had recited the lines extempore when Bacon went out to see about fetching fresh supplies of whisky toddy.

Bacon however took a keen interest in the poet and in 1798 purchased the bed that Burns was born in from Gilbert Burns at nearby Dinning Farm. Bacon installed the bed at Brownhill and showing his business acumen, charged customers and others to see it. A groom at Brownhill, Joe Langhorne, slept in it for many years and in 1829 purchased it himself. Langhorne took it to Dumfries where the bed was eventually broken up by a relative and used to make snuff boxes that bore a commemorative inscription to Burns.

Bacon's brother-in-law, his wife's brother, was William Stewart (1749-1812), son therefore of the innkeepers at Closeburn Kirk Bridge. William was the factor or grieve at the Dalswinton Estate of the Rev. James Stuart Menteith and a good friend of Robert Burns who often visited Closeburn Castle. He was the father of "lovely Polly Stewart", and the brother-in-law to John Bacon the Landlord.

In 1788, Bacon's wife, Catherine Stewart, inspired an offended Burns to compose the poem "The Henpecked Husband" upon her refusing to serve her husband and the poet with more liquor when Burns was staying the night and they were engaged in a drinking bout at Brownhill. How much is truly revealed by Burns of the Landlord's personality is open to question:

John Bacon died, intestate, on the 1 November 1824 and the court records show that he had two executors who were his closest living relatives, John Bacon of Huntingdon and Joseph Bacon of Whitehaven. His estate was worth £1037 19s 11 1/4d.

Association with Robert Burns

The 'Ayrshire Monthly Newsletter' of 1844 reported that "At the sale of the effects of Mr Bacon, Brownhill Inn, after his death in 1825, his snuff-box, being found to bear the inscription: "Robert Burns - Officer of the Excise" - although only a 'cloot' or horn mounted with silver, sold for £5. It was understood to have been presented by Burns to Bacon, with whom he had spent many a merry night."

One summer evening in 1793, whilst dining at the inn with Dr Purdie of Sanquhar and another friend, Burns encountered a weary soldier and upon listening to his story of the many adventures he had lived through, was inspired to write his famous song "The Soldier's Return" 

In 1791 Burns on one occasion angered Bacon's wife by engraving the lines "You're Welcome, Willie Stewart" on a glass tumbler with his diamond-point pen. Catherine however was able to sell the glass tumbler for a shilling to a customer, who purchased it as a memento. Another version of the story places the event at the Closeburn Kirk Bridge Inn where the landlady was Catherine Stewart Bacon's mother.

The engraved tumbler survives to this day having become a treasured part of Sir Walter Scott's collections at Abbotsford House.

Burns also wrote verses in honour of 'Polly Stewart', Bacon's niece, William Stewart's daughter.

It is also recorded that 'One Monday even' Burns sent a rhymed epistle to William Stewart from Brownhill Inn, probably in January 1793, beginning :

In the Ladies' Own Journal of 3 September 1870, published in Glasgow and Edinburgh, an article was published that claimed that Burns had engraved on some window panes certain verses that even best friends were ashamed of. The article claimed that Sir Charles D. Stuart-Menteith, Bart of Closeburn Castle had these window panes carefully removed and packed away. Following his father's death Sir James is said to have examined these artefacts and was so shocked that he destroyed them in order to preserve Burns's reputation. Watson, a local man, records in 1901 that the poem concerned was "The Henpecked Husband."

References
Notes

Further reading

 Brown, Hilton (1949). There was a Lad. London : Hamish Hamilton.
 Burns, Robert (1839). The Poetical Works of Robert Burns. The Aldine Edition of the British Poets. London : William Pickering.
 De Lancey Ferguson, J. (1931). The Letters of Robert Burns. Oxford : Clarendon Press.
 Douglas, William Scott (Edit.) 1938. The Kilmarnock Edition of the Poetical Works of Robert Burns. Glasgow : The Scottish Daily Express.
 Hecht, Hans (1936). Robert Burns. The Man and His Work. London : William Hodge.
 Mackay, James A. (2004). Burns. A Biography of Robert Burns. Darvel : Alloway Publishing. .
 Mackay, James A. (1988). Burns-Lore of Dumfries and Galloway. Ayr : Alloway Publishing. .
 McIntyre, Ian (2001). Robert Burns. A Life. New York : Welcome Rain Publishers. .
 McNaught, Duncan (1921). The Truth about Robert Burns. Glasgow : Maclehose, Jackson & Co. 
 McQueen, Colin Hunter (2008). Hunter's Illustrated History of the Family, Friends and Contemporaries of Robert Burns. Messsrs Hunter McQueen & Hunter. 
 Purdie, David, McCue & Carruthers, G (2013). Maurice Lindsay's The Burns Encyclopaedia. London : Robert Hale. 
 Ross Roy, G. (1985). Letters of Robert Burns. Oxford : Clarendon Press.

External links
Video footage of Brownill Inn and its history
Video footage of the 'Soldier's Return' site at Millmannoch
You're Welcome, Willie Stewart performed by Driftwood.
Researching the Life and Times of Robert Burns 
Video footage and tales of the Closeburn churches.
Video footage of the 11th century Dalgarnock Kirk site and burial ground
'Crichope Linn - Devil's Cauldron, Burley's Leap and the Souter's Seat.

Coaching inns
Buildings and structures in Dumfries and Galloway
Robert Burns
1824 deaths